London General is a bus company operating in Greater London. It is a subsidiary of the Go-Ahead Group and operates services under contract to Transport for London. The company is named after the London General Omnibus Company, the principal operator of buses in London between 1855 and 1933.

History

The modern-day London General commenced operating on 1 April 1989 when London Buses was divided into 11 separate business units. Its original logo being an omnibus in reflection of the name's history. In 1994 the company was sold in a management buyout, before being sold to the Go-Ahead Group for £46 million in May 1996.

The company moved its offices to an address in Merton, adjacent to the Merton bus garage. In August 2008, Go-Ahead's London bus operations all adopted the Go-Ahead London trading name, although the individual company names are still applied beneath the logo.

In October 2009, Go-Ahead completed the purchase of East Thames Buses from Transport for London and incorporated it into London General. Although Transport for London's normal practice is to put routes out for tender, London General began a new five-year contract for all East Thames Buses routes without going through the tendering process.

In March 2012, First London's Northumberland Park garage was purchased. On 1 April 2014, the London operations of Metrobus depots in Croydon and Orpington  were integrated into London General. On 25 April 2014, the Vehicle and Operator Services Agency formally increased London General's licence to accommodate the Metrobus buses. However, as at September 2014, the buses continued to carry Metrobus branding.

Garages

London General operates 9 bus garages.

Merton (AL)
As of January 2023, Merton garage operate routes 44, 57, 131, 152, 163, 164, 200, 219, 280, 413 and 470. It also runs the St. Bede's School private bus services 514 and 519, which run between the Caterham area and the school, on behalf of Surrey County Council.

History
The garage was modernised in 1960, and again in 1991 when a new roof was fitted and various stores and welfare areas were moved to provide a larger, unobstructed parking area, which had previously been long and narrow. Merton was also responsible for the maintenance of vehicles for route 200 in 1988/9 after the withdrawal of the Cityrama sightseeing company, whilst the route was operated from Sutton garage.

The garage has become Go-Ahead London's head office, following the sale of Raleigh House, Mitcham and the acquisition of the former pub (King's Head, Merton) next door.

Sutton (A)
As at February 2023, Sutton garage operate routes 80, 93, 151, 154 and 213.

History
Opened by the London General Omnibus Company in January 1924 at cost of £30,000, Sutton garage had a capacity for 100 buses. During its early years, less than half of the garage was put to use, holding only 40 buses by 1926. This would change somewhat by the extension of the Underground to Morden and major house-building projects in the area. Between 1945 and 1953, it had an allocation of exactly 100 relaxed-Utility Daimlers (classed as Ds) numbered from D182 - D281. By 1952, the garage had 128 buses allocated, achieved mainly by parking buses in surrounding streets. However, this would soon fall again, to 100 in 1966, 82 in 1976 and 62 in 1987. The garage passed to the reborn London General bus company in the run-up to privatisation in 1985. Sutton Garage also partly took control of route 200 at a yard in Colliers Wood (AA) in 1989, after Cityrama withdrew from their contract. Sutton was responsible for providing drivers for the service, whilst Merton garage were contracted to do the maintenance. By 1994, the garage allocation had grown to 85 buses and again to 92 in 2001, including 10 buses subcontracted to Surrey County Council.

Sutton also helped when Carshalton garage closed in 1964.

Putney (AF)

As of March 2020, Putney garage operate routes 14, 22, 74, 209, 337, 378, 424, 430, N22, N74 and N97.

History
With its ancestry going back to the horse bus days of the 1880s, Chelverton Road Garage was converted to a motor-bus garage in 1912. The garage is well hidden in a side road with a modest frontage, yet it has an allocation of 112. It has been modernised twice, firstly in 1935 and then again in 1985. The garage was well known for being allocated the pre-war RTs in 1940, which displaced the STLs. During the war the garage was under-utilised and was used to store de-licensed buses. Renamed Putney, in 1963, after the closure of Putney Bridge Garage (F), it started to receive both short and long wheelbase AEC Routemasters for its Central London routes. The Routemasters remained at the garage until July 2005, when both the 14 and 22 were converted to low floor one-person-operated buses.

Croydon (C)
As of February 2023, Croydon garage operate routes 119, 127, 197, 264, 355, 359, 403, 434, 455, 463, S1 and X26

History
The Beddington Lane depot was opened by Metrobus in December 2005 to house route 127 which had been surrendered early by Centra. Work was completed on the garage buildings in February 2006. This garage took over the London routes that ran from Godstone with the exception of the 146 and 246 which moved to Orpington.
In April 2014, Go-Ahead London took over this garage (and Orpington) from Metrobus, however the garages are still in the same place.

Orpington (MB)
As of August 2020, the Green Street Green garage operate routes 126, 138, 162, 208, 227, 233, 320, 352, 353, 354, 358, 654, R1, R2, R3, R4, R5, R6, R7, R8, R9, R10 and R11.

History
A former farm, Green Street Green depot was for many years the only garage for all of Metrobus' London tendered routes since the award of route 61 in 1986. More recently routes have been operated from Godstone and in December 2005 a new depot was constructed in Croydon to cope with new tender awards. During mid-2005 major reconstruction started on the Green Street Green site to make improvements and provide an expansion. During these works, a temporary base was being used at Sevenoaks in next to the base of what was Southlands Travel.

Northumberland Park (NP)
As of February 2023, Northumberland Park garage operate routes  67, 76, 106, 153, 184, 212, 214, 230, 232, 357, 379, 444, 456, 476, 657 and W15.

History
Capital Citybus was bought out by the management team in late 1995, and subsequently by FirstGroup in 1998 becoming First Capital.

In March 2012, FirstGroup sold Northumberland Park garage, together with its route contracts, vehicles and staff to the Go-Ahead Group with it becoming part of London General. On 13 October 2017, route 257 was transferred to Stagecoach London (East London) On 2 June 2018, route 491 was transferred to Metroline. On  9 June 2018, route 231 was transferred to Metroline and route 327 was transferred to Sullivan Buses.

Waterside Way (PL)
As at February 2020, Waterside Way, Wimbledon garage operated routes 39, 485, and 493. This depot also acts as a storage for the training bus fleet.

Waterloo (RA)
Waterloo garage operates route 153 and Red Arrow routes 507 and 521.

History
The garage opened in the early 1980s as a Red Arrow garage and in the 1990s had an allocation of AEC Routemasters for route 11. The garage only operates Monday to Friday due to its proximity to residential properties.

In June 2002. the Red Arrow Leyland Nationals were replaced by London's first fleet of Mercedes-Benz Citaro articulated buses. Because of the extra space required to stable these, the route 11 Routemasters were transferred to Stockwell garage. In September 2009 the articulated fleet was replaced by Mercedes-Benz O530 Citaros.

Stockwell (SW)
As of February 2023, Stockwell Garage operate routes 11, 77, 87, 88, 91, 93, 118, 155, 170, G1, N11, N44, N87, N91 and N155

History
Opened in 1952 after nearly four years of planning and building with many materials short of supply and problems re-housing residents of the houses that stood on the site. Stockwell garage is a listed building, and when built was a masterpiece of architectural design incorporating a new roof structure that did not need supports which enabled for a  unobstructed parking space. The offices and workshops are on the edges of the garage but do not take up any of the parking space. In the first few days of operation the garage ran just 11 buses on route 178 which had moved from Rye Lane (Peckham), but then gained more work from the next stage of the tram replacement program for which it had been designed, but it was still well short of capacity.

More work arrived in late 1953 and early 1954 when routes 77 and 77A (now 87) moved from Victoria garage due to recruitment problems, and the closure of Nunhead which increased the PVR to 110 buses. In the early 1970s the Round London Sightseeing Tours moved to Stockwell. In 1984 Stockwell was chosen to conduct comparative testing on route 170, consisting of MCW Metrobuses, Leyland Titans, Leyland Olympians, Dennis Dominators, and Volvo Ailsas. The allocation steadied at around 120 for many years, but has increased in the last few years, partially due to taking back full control of route 11 from Waterloo garage.

Former garages

Mandela Way (MW)
As at May 2015, Mandela Way, Bermondsey garage operate routes 1, 453, 521, 624, 658 and N1. It was included in the 2009 East Thames Buses purchase.
On 28 July 2017, Mandela Way garage was closed with bus routes being transferred to other garages.

Belvedere (BV)
As at May 2015, Belvedere garage operated routes 180, 244, 669 and N1.

History
Belvedere was purchased by Harris Bus in 1998 to house its operations that moved from Crayford. Harris Bus went into receivership in 2000, and its routes and garage were taken over by London Buses under the guise of East Thames Buses. East Thames Buses remained a subsidiary of London Buses, taking over routes from defunct operators such as London Easylink's 42 and 185 when this company ceased operating in 2002. Following the move to Mandela Way the engineering is now done there, however limited engineering facilities exist at Belvedere.

In October 2009, East Thames Buses was sold to Go-Ahead London. As a result of the purchase by Go-Ahead some route and allocation movements have taken or are due to take place.

Even though Belvedere was a London General Garage it operated as a satellite of London Central's Bexleyheath garage. All of Belvedere's engineering and fleet and staff management was done at or organised by Bexleyheath.

Belvedere Garage closed on 1 December 2017 when the lease expired. Routes 180 and N1 transferred to the recently opened Morden Wharf bus garage in Greenwich, while Routes 244 and 669 transferred to Bexleyheath.

See also
List of bus operators of the United Kingdom

References

External links
 
 Company website

Go-Ahead Group London bus operators
1989 establishments in England
Putney